In mathematics, a power series (in one variable) is an infinite series of the form

where an represents the coefficient of the nth term and c is a constant. Power series are useful in mathematical analysis, where they arise as Taylor series of infinitely differentiable functions. In fact, Borel's theorem implies that every power series is the Taylor series of some smooth function.

In many situations, c (the center of the series) is equal to zero, for instance when considering a Maclaurin series.  In such cases, the power series takes the simpler form

Beyond their role in mathematical analysis, power series also occur in combinatorics as generating functions (a kind of formal power series) and in electronic engineering (under the name of the Z-transform). In number theory, the concept of p-adic numbers is also closely related to that of a power series.

Examples

Polynomial

Any polynomial can be easily expressed as a power series around any center c, although all but finitely many of the coefficients will be zero since a power series has infinitely many terms by definition.  For instance, the polynomial  can be written as a power series around the center  as

or around the center  as

Or indeed the expansion is possible around any other center c.  One can view power series as being like "polynomials of infinite degree," although power series are not polynomials.

Geometric series, exponential function and sine
The geometric series formula

and the sine formula

valid for all real x.

These power series are also examples of Taylor series.

On the set of exponents 

Negative powers are not permitted in a power series; for instance,  is not considered a power series (although it is a Laurent series). The coefficients  are not allowed to depend on  thus for instance:

is not a power series.

Radius of convergence

If  is not the only point of convergence, then there is always a number  with  such that the series converges whenever  and diverges whenever . The number  is called the radius of convergence of the power series; in general it is given as

or, equivalently,

(this is the Cauchy–Hadamard theorem; see limit superior and limit inferior for an explanation of the notation). The relation

is also satisfied, if this limit exists.

The set of the complex numbers such that  is called the disc of convergence of the series. The series converges absolutely inside its disc of convergence, and converges uniformly on every compact subset of the disc of convergence.

For , there is no general statement on the convergence of the series.

Operations on power series

Addition and subtraction 
When two functions f and g are decomposed into power series around the same center c, the power series of the sum or difference of the functions can be obtained by termwise addition and subtraction. That is, if
 and 
then

It is not true that if two power series  and  have the same radius of convergence, then  also has this radius of convergence.

The sum of two power series will have, at minimum, a radius of convergence of the smaller of the two radii of convergence of the two series (and it may be higher than either, as seen in the example above).

Multiplication and division 

The sequence  is known as the convolution of the sequences  and 

For division, if one defines the sequence  by

then 

and one can solve recursively for the terms  by comparing coefficients.

Differentiation and integration
Once a function  is given as a power series as above, it is differentiable on the interior of the domain of convergence. It can be differentiated and integrated quite easily, by treating every term separately:

Both of these series have the same radius of convergence as the original one.

Analytic functions 

A function f defined on some open subset U of R or C is called analytic if it is locally given by a convergent power series. This means that every a ∈ U has an open neighborhood V ⊆ U, such that there exists a power series with center a that converges to f(x) for every x ∈ V.

Every power series with a positive radius of convergence is analytic on the interior of its region of convergence. All holomorphic functions are complex-analytic. Sums and products of analytic functions are analytic, as are quotients as long as the denominator is non-zero.

If a function is analytic, then it is infinitely differentiable, but in the real case the converse is not generally true. For an analytic function, the coefficients an can be computed as

This means that every analytic function is locally represented by its Taylor series.

The global form of an analytic function is completely determined by its local behavior in the following sense: if f and g are two analytic functions defined on the same connected open set U, and if there exists an element  such that  for all , then  for all .

The power series expansion of the inverse function of an analytic function can be determined using the Lagrange inversion theorem.

Behavior near the boundary 

The sum of a power series with a positive radius of convergence is an analytic function at every point in the interior of the disc of convergence. However, different behavior can occur at points on the boundary of that disc. For example:

 Convergent at some points divergent at others:  has radius of convergence .
 Absolute convergence at every point of the boundary:  has radius of convergence , while it converges absolutely, and uniformly, at every point of  due to Weierstrass M-test applied with the hyper-harmonic convergent series .
A sufficient condition for one-sided continuity at a boundary point is given by Abel's theorem.

Formal power series 

In abstract algebra, one attempts to capture the essence of power series without being restricted to the fields of real and complex numbers, and without the need to talk about convergence. This leads to the concept of formal power series, a concept of great utility in algebraic combinatorics.

Power series in several variables 
An extension of the theory is necessary for the purposes of multivariable calculus. A power series is here defined to be an infinite series of the form

where  is a vector of natural numbers, the coefficients  are usually real or complex numbers, and the center  and argument  are usually real or complex vectors. The symbol  is the product symbol, denoting multiplication. In the more convenient multi-index notation this can be written

where  is the set of natural numbers, and so  is the set of ordered n-tuples of natural numbers.

The theory of such series is trickier than for single-variable series, with more complicated regions of convergence. For instance, the power series  is absolutely convergent in the set  between two hyperbolas.  (This is an example of a log-convex set, in the sense that the set of points , where  lies in the above region, is a convex set.  More generally, one can show that when c=0, the interior of the region of absolute convergence is always a log-convex set in this sense.)  On the other hand, in the interior of this region of convergence one may differentiate and integrate under the series sign, just as one may with ordinary power series.

Order of a power series 
Let  be a multi-index for a power series . In particular, for a power series f(x) in a single variable x, the order of f is the smallest power of x with a nonzero coefficient. This definition readily extends to Laurent series.

Notes

References

External links 
 
 
 Powers of Complex Numbers by Michael Schreiber, Wolfram Demonstrations Project.

Real analysis
Complex analysis
Multivariable calculus
Mathematical series